Goran Prpić (born 4 May 1964) is a Croatian tennis coach and former professional tennis player, who played for SFR Yugoslavia and Croatia.

Biography
Prpić was born in Zagreb, at the time in SR Croatia, SFR Yugoslavia.
He turned professional in 1984. His career was nearly ended by a serious knee injury in February 1986. After a surgery, Prpić spent two years recovering before returning to the Tour. For the rest of his playing career, he wore a custom-made knee brace.

During his career, he won one top-level singles title (at Umag in 1990) and one doubles title (San Remo in 1990). His joint best performance at a Grand Slam tournament was at the 1991 Australian Open, where he reached the quarter-finals. He also reached the quarter-finals of the 1993 French Open. His career-high singles ranking was World No. 16 in 1991.

In 1990, Prpić was a member of the team from Yugoslavia which won the World Team Cup. In 1991, he teamed-up with Monica Seles to help Yugoslavia win the Hopman Cup. A year later in 1992, Prpić teamed-up with Goran Ivanišević to win the men's doubles Bronze Medal at the Olympic Games in Barcelona for the newly independent nation of Croatia.

Prpić retired from the professional tour in 1996.

In 2000, he became the coach of the Croatian women's national tennis team, and in 2006, he also took over coaching of the men's national tennis team. He resigned from both positions in November 2011.

ATP Career Finals

Singles: 3 (1 title, 2 runner-ups)

Doubles: 2 (1 title, 1 runner-up)

ATP Challenger and ITF Futures finals

Singles: 3 (2–1)

Doubles: 4 (2–2)

Performance timelines

Singles

Doubles

References

External links

 
 
 

1964 births
Living people
Croatian male tennis players
Croatian tennis coaches
Franjo Bučar Award winners
Hopman Cup competitors
Olympic bronze medalists for Croatia
Olympic medalists in tennis
Olympic tennis players of Croatia
Tennis players from Zagreb
Tennis players at the 1992 Summer Olympics
Yugoslav male tennis players
Medalists at the 1992 Summer Olympics